Ventnor railway station was the terminus of the Isle of Wight Railway line from Ryde.

History
A turntable was used to allow steam engines to runaround their trains. In later years it was replaced by a three way switch. The tracks merged just before the tunnel and the locomotives had to enter the tunnel during runround manoeuvres.

The station had a platform connected to the station buildings and a narrow island platform.  There was only one track between the side platform and the island platform.  When this track was occupied, an incoming train arrived at the outer face of the island platform and passengers had to pass through the train on the inner track. When this train then departed, a temporary bridge that was a ship's gangway, as used on the Portsmouth to Ryde ferries was manually pushed across the intervening track to allow passenger access to the train on the outside of the island platform. Further away from the station buildings were goods sidings which mainly served coal merchants who operated from caves in the chalk sides of the station cutting.

The station closed to all traffic in April 1966, when the line south of  fell victim to the Beeching Axe.  The track was lifted by 1970 and the station subsequently demolished.  The site is now an industrial park and Southern Water runs water pipes through the tunnel.

This station should not be confused with Ventnor West railway station.

Stationmasters

Mr. Crutchley ca. 1867 ca. 1868
Jeremiah Savage Elgee ca. 1869 ca. 1875
William Wetherick ca. 1878 ca. 1905 (formerly station master at Brading)
William Wheway ca. 1908 ca. 1910
Philip Jenkin 1912 - 1927 (formerly station master at Wroxall)
Percy Hawkins 1930 - 1936 (formerly station master at Horsley, afterwards station master at Newport)
Oliver William Bennett from 1936 (formerly station master at Ottery St Mary)

See also
 List of closed railway stations in Britain

References

External links
Ventnor Station on Disused Stations

Disused railway stations on the Isle of Wight
Former Isle of Wight Railway stations
Railway stations in Great Britain opened in 1866
Railway stations in Great Britain closed in 1966
Beeching closures in England
1866 establishments in England
Railway station